Tregarthen can refer to:

A village near Goldsithney in Cornwall.
 Tregarthen's Hotel
 John Coulson Tregarthen (1854–1933), British naturalist and writer 
 Enys Tregarthen (pseudonym), British writer Nellie Sloggett (1851–1923)

Surnames of British Isles origin